Raise Gruppen (formerly Nikita Gruppen) is a Norwegian hair and beauty company. It has salons in Norway and Sweden.

The company was founded in 1984 by Inger Ellen Nicolaisen. It operates under the brands Nikita Hair, Hair Barber Shop, Alex Verdini, Preus Barber Events, Head Masters and Norwegian Hair and Skin Care School.

References

External links
Official Website

Retail companies of Norway
Hair salons